Yartsy is a rural locality (a settlement) in Pribaykalsky District, Republic of Buryatia, Russia. The population was 80 as of 2010. There is 1 street.

Geography 
Yartsy is located 105 km north of Turuntayevo (the district's administrative centre) by road. Turka is the nearest rural locality.

References 

Rural localities in Okinsky District